Oryzoideae (syn. Ehrhartoideae) is a subfamily of the true grass family Poaceae. It has around 120 species in 19 genera, notably including the major cereal crop rice. Within the grasses, this subfamily is one of three belonging to the species-rich BOP clade, which all use C3 photosynthesis; it is the basal lineage of the clade.

It contains four tribes and one genus of unclear position (incertae sedis): Suddia (thought likely to be in the tribe Phyllorachideae). Phylogenetic analyses have resolved the branching order of these clades within the subfamily:

References 

 
Poaceae subfamilies
Taxa named by Carl Sigismund Kunth